Jonas Burba (February 1, 1907 – 1964) was an artist born in Skuodas, Lithuania. His notable works include the interwar design of the Order of Vytautas the Great and the Order of the Lithuanian Grand Duke Gediminas.

References

1907 births
1964 deaths
Lithuanian artists
Recipients of the Order of the Lithuanian Grand Duke Gediminas
People from Skuodas